Amor Comprado (English title: Love Contract) is a telenovela written by Verónica Suárez and produced in Miami, Florida by Venevisión International in 2007.

Elizabeth Gutiérrez and José Ángel Llamas starred as the protagonists with Marjorie de Sousa, Zully Montero and Patricia Álvarez as the antagonists.

Univision began airing Amor Comprado at 1PM/12C, replacing Nunca Te Diré Adiós. It began airing in Venezuela on October 29, 2008, via Venevisión Plus at 10:00pm with repeats Monday to Saturday at 1:00pm.

Plot
Young playboy Willy de la Fuente is in a bind. If he doesn't marry by his rapidly approaching 30th birthday, he'll lose his inheritance—something his mean-spirited grandmother Gertrudis is looking forward to. Despite this, he's not interested in marriage because he believes—thanks to his grandmother's constant attacks on his own self-esteem—that women aren't interested in him for anything else but his money.

Mariana is also in a bind. Her father is in jail after accidentally killing the young man who attempted to rape her, and she desperately needs to come up with the money to hire a lawyer for his defense. And with her father already recovering from one nearly fatal beating, she's running out of time...

Willy finally decides to "audition" his next wife. He puts an ad in the paper searching for a wife—much to Gertrudis' consternation. He then meets Mariana, and they hit it off—at least until he discovers that she only married him for the money, which she will not get if she doesn't remain married to him.

Eventually, the two of them really do fall in love, but Gertrudis will go to any length to tear them apart. Willy's pain is her pleasure.

Cast

 Elizabeth Gutiérrez as Mariana Gómez
 José Ángel Llamas as Guillermo "Willy" Cantú de la Fuente
 Marjorie de Sousa as Margot Salinas
 Zully Montero as Gertrudis De La Fuente
 José Bardina as Luciano De La Fuente
 Anna Silvetti as Morgana De La Fuente
 Roberto Mateos as Arturo Garibay
 Karen Senties as Leonora Gómez
 Patricia Alvarez as Natalia 
 Julian Gil as Esteban Rondero  
 Brianda Riquer as Juliana   
 Fernando Carrera as Valentín
 Nelida Ponce as Matilda
 Reynaldo Cruz as Ernesto
 Isabel Moreno as Rosa  
 Carlos Garin as Lcdo. Gutiérrez
 Franklin Virgüez as Saladino
 Laura Ferretti as Teresa   
 Graciela Doring as Panchita
 Andrés García Jr. as Santiago
 Raul Olivo as Enrique
 Bobby Larios as Hilario
 Adrian Carvajal as Ricardo
 Marianne Lovera as Elena
 Marisela Buitrago as Lisette
 Carlos Augusto Maldonado as Martin
 Julio Capote as Jeremias
 Liannet Borrego as Veronica
 Yami Quintero as Renata
 Ernesto Molina as detective

References

External links 

2008 telenovelas
Spanish-language American telenovelas
Venevisión telenovelas
Univision telenovelas
2008 American television series debuts
2008 American television series endings
2008 Venezuelan television series debuts
2008 Venezuelan television series endings
Television shows set in Miami
Television shows filmed in Miami
Venezuelan telenovelas
American telenovelas